Joseph Giglio (born September 12, 1954) is an american politician, who is serving as a member of the New York State Assembly since 2005. He first represented the 149th district from 2005 until 2012, before being redistricted to the 148th district in 2013.

Early life and education
Giglio was born on September 12, 1954, in Buffalo, New York. He received an associate degree at Hilbert College and a bachelor's degree from the University at Buffalo.

Political career

Early political career 
Giglio served as a special assistant to then-New York State Attorney General Dennis Vacco, as an employee of the Cattaraugus County Sheriff's Department. Following this, Giglio served as Deputy Inspector General. As Deputy Inspector, he conducted investigations of alleged criminal activity, fraud, and abuse.

New York State Assembly

Elections 
Giglio was elected to the New York State Assembly after defeating Cattaraugus County legislator Carmen Vecchiarella in a special election on June 28, 2005. He won re-election in 2006 over Cattaraugus County legislator Linda Witte and again in 2008 over Allegany County supervisor Patrick Eaton. He was re-elected again in 2010, defeating Travis Lecceadone.

Tenure 
Giglio is the Chairman of the Assembly Minority Conference’s Steering Committee.

Giglio’s current committee assignments are as follows: Correction (Ranking Minority Member); Aging; Children and Families; Ethics and Guidance; and Codes. He was also selected to co-chair the Assembly Minority Statewide Forum on Workforce Issues in the Correctional System.

He has also been a member of the Medicaid Waste, Fraud and Abuse Task Force, the Agriculture, Tourism and Outdoor Recreation Task Force, and the Crime in our Communities Task Force.

Personal life

Giglio is married to Ann Marie. Together, they have four children. They reside in the village town of Gowanda, New York.

See also

 New York State Assembly

References

External links
New York State Assembly member website
Vote Smart: Assembly Member Joe Giglio (NY)

1954 births
Living people
American people of Italian descent
Hilbert College alumni
Republican Party members of the New York State Assembly
People from Cattaraugus County, New York
University at Buffalo alumni
21st-century American politicians